If I Hadn't Met You is a Spanish Catalan-language fantasy television series created by  Sergi Belbel that originally aired on TV3 from 15 October to 17 December 2018. It stars Pablo Derqui, Andrea Ros, and Mercedes Sampietro, among others.

Plot
The plot revolves around Eduard, who loses his wife Elisa and their kids in a car accident. Later, a mysterious woman known as Dr. Everest teaches Eduard how to travel to alternate universes, which leads him to try to find a world in which his family can be saved.

Cast and characters

Production and release
The series was created by Sergi Belbel. The series was pre-screened at the Sitges Film Festival. It premiered on TV3 on 15 October 2018. The original broadcasting run ended on 17 December 2018.

References

External links
 
 
 

Catalan television programmes
2010s Spanish drama television series
2018 Spanish television series debuts
Television series about parallel universes
Spanish fantasy television series
2018 Spanish television series endings
2010s supernatural television series
Television series by Diagonal TV